Tang Da Wu (born 1943) is a Singaporean artist who works in a variety of media, including drawing, painting, sculpture, installation art and performance art. Educated at Birmingham Polytechnic and Goldsmiths' College, University of London, Tang gave his first solo exhibition, consisting of drawings and paintings, in 1970 at the Singapore Chinese Chamber of Commerce and Industry. He began engaging in performance art upon returning to Singapore in 1979 following his undergraduate studies.

In 1988, Tang founded The Artists Village. The first art colony to be established in Singapore, it aimed to encourage artists to create experimental art. Members of the Village were among the first contemporary artists in Singapore, and also among the first to begin practising installation art and performance art. There, Tang mentored younger artists and informed them about artistic developments in other parts of the world. He also organized exhibitions and symposia at the Village, and arranged for it to collaborate with the National Museum Art Gallery and the National Arts Council's 1992 Singapore Festival of the Arts.

In January 1994, the National Arts Council (NAC) stopped funding unscripted performance art following a controversial performance by Josef Ng that was regarded as obscene by many members of the public. From that time, Tang and other performance artists mostly practised their art abroad, although some performances were presented in Singapore as dance or theatre. For his originality and influence in performance art in Southeast Asia, among other things, Tang won the Arts and Culture Prize in 1999 at the 10th Fukuoka Asian Culture Prizes. The NAC eventually reversed its no-funding rule on performance art in September 2003. Tang was one of four artists who represented Singapore at the 2007 Venice Biennale. Tang's work is part of the collection of the Singapore Art Museum, Queensland Art Gallery and the Solomon R. Guggenheim Museum.

Tang has expressed concern about environmental and social issues through his art, such as the works They Poach the Rhino, Chop Off His Horn and Make This Drink (1989) and Tiger's Whip (1991).  He believes in the potential of the individual and collective to effect social changes, and his art deals with national and cultural identities. Tang has participated in numerous community and public art projects, workshops and performances.

Education and personal life

Tang Da Wu was born Thang Kian Hiong in Singapore in 1943, the eldest of four sons. His second brother Thang Kiang How is himself a visual artist based in Singapore. His father was a journalist with the Chinese daily newspaper Sin Chew Jit Poh He studied at a Chinese-medium school, but disliked English and mathematics and was often scolded by his teachers. He preferred playing after school with neighbourhood children and learned to speak Malay and Chinese from them. He also enjoyed drawing, and gained confidence when his secondary school paintings were accepted in art competitions.

In 1968, Tang was awarded a diploma in youth and community works from the National Youth Leadership Institute. Two years later, in 1970, his first solo exhibition of drawings and paintings sponsored by the Singapore Art Society was staged at the Singapore Chinese Chamber of Commerce and Industry. Subsequently, he went to the United Kingdom to study, majoring in sculpture. He graduated with a Bachelor of Fine Arts (BFA), with first class honours, from the School of Fine Art, Birmingham Polytechnic, in 1974. While abroad he changed his name to Da Wu, which is Mandarin for "big mist". Tang later returned to the UK and attended advanced courses at the Saint Martins School of Art. He received a Master of Fine Arts (MFA) in 1985 from Goldsmiths' College, University of London, and a doctorate in 1988.

Tang is married to an Englishwoman, Hazel McIntosh. They have a son, Ben Zai, known professionally as Zai Tang, who is a sound artist living in the UK.

Career

Early career and founding of The Artists Village
Returning to Singapore in 1979 after completing his undergraduate studies, Tang engaged in performance art, works of art that are composed of actions performed by the artist at a certain place and time. The following year, he staged a work of installation art called Earthworks at the National Museum Art Gallery. This comprised two works, The Product of the Sun and Me and The Product of the Rain and Me, which were made up of dishes of earth, lumps of soil, and pieces of soiled and water-stained linen which he had hung in gullies at Ang Mo Kio, a construction site in the process of being turned into a public housing estate. Installation art uses sculptural materials, and sometimes other media such as sound, video and performance, to modify the way a particular space is experienced.

In 1988, Tang founded The Artists Village, originally located at 61B Lorong Gambas in rural Ulu Sembawang, in the north part of Singapore. The first art colony to be established in Singapore, its goal was to inspire artists to create experimental art. Tang described the Artists Village as:

T.K. Sabapathy noted: "The Village was a beacon, and Da Wu both a catalyst and mentor." Among the artists who moved to the Village were Ahmad Mashadi, Faizal Fadil, Amanda Heng, Ho Soon Yeen, Lim Poh Teck, Tang Mun Kit, Wong Shih Yaw, Juliana Yasin and Zai Kuning. They were among the first contemporary artists in Singapore, and also among the first to begin practising installation art and performance art. Tang mentored younger artists and exposed them to artistic developments in other parts of the world. He also organized exhibitions and symposia at the Village, and arranged for collaborations with the National Museum Art Gallery and the National Arts Council's 1992 Singapore Festival of the Arts. Although The Artists Village lost its original site in 1990 due to land development, it was registered as a non-profit society in February 1992 and now stages events in various public spaces.

Difficulties with performance art

In January 1994, artist Josef Ng cut off his pubic hair with his back to the audience during a performance protesting the media's coverage of gay issues. The event was reported by The New Paper, and the resulting public outcry over its perceived obscenity led the National Arts Council (NAC) to cease funding unscripted performance art. After that, Tang and other performance artists practised their art mostly abroad, although some performances were presented in Singapore as dance or theatre. Interviewed in August 2001, T. Sasitharan, co-director of the Practice Performing Arts School, said that a review of the NAC's policy was "long overdue" and noted that although Tang had received the Fukuoka Asian Culture Prize in 1999, "the art form he practises is de facto banned in Singapore". The NAC eventually reversed its no-funding rule on performance art in September 2003.

In August 1995, the President of Singapore Ong Teng Cheong visited Singapore Art '95, an exhibition and sale of artworks by Singapore artists. Tang wore a black jacket emblazoned on the back with "Don't give money to the arts" in yellow and handed a note to the President that read, "I am an artist. I am important." Although Tang was prevented from speaking to the President by an aide-de-camp, he later told the media he wished to tell the President that artists are important and that public money funded the "wrong kind of art", art that was too commercial and had no taste.

Recent activities
Tang was the subject of one episode of artist Ho Tzu Nyen's documentary television series 4x4 Episodes of Singapore Art, which was broadcast on Arts Central (present-day Okto channel) in October 2005. He was also one of the four artists representing Singapore at the 2007 Venice Biennale. He presented an installation, Untitled, consisting of two beds positioned upright, the trunks of plantain trees, a portable ancestral altar, a handmade album of drawings and photographs, and other found objects. Drawings of people and faces were strapped to the beds and wrapped around the tree trunks. The installation was accompanied by a recording by Tang's son, Zai Tang, of sounds captured in Venice during a single day. The work was described by the National Arts Council as suggestive of "the restlessness, rootlessness, spiritual wandering and emotional estrangement that mark the travelling life". In 2007, a work by Tang consisting of ink paintings around a well, and representing the erosion of village communities by urban development, was acquired by the Queensland Art Gallery for its Gallery of Modern Art. From January to June 2016, Tang presented Earth Work 1979 at the National Gallery Singapore, a re-staging of his 1979 exhibition, the first recorded instance of Singapore land art. The exhibition includes "Gully Curtains", where Tang placed large pieces of fabric between gullies and let the rain and sun mark the fabric. His work Tiger's Whip (1991) is also displayed at the National Gallery's DBS Singapore Gallery. In 2017, Tang started the performance-art group Station House Da Opera, comprising more than 60 art educators, students, and fellow local artists.

Known for his reticence, Tang remains an enigmatic person. In an August 2008 interview with the Straits Times, fellow artist Vincent Leow said of Tang: "He's a very hands-on person, very improvisational and has good ideas. But he doesn't really talk much. You can't really tell who he is."

Art
Tang has expressed concern about environmental and social issues through his art, such as the works They Poach the Rhino, Chop Off His Horn and Make This Drink (1989), Under the Table All Going One Direction (1992) and Tiger's Whip, also known as I Want My Penis Back (1991). He first presented the latter work, an installation and performance piece, in 1991 in Singapore's Chinatown. It consisted of ten life-sized tigers made from wire mesh covered with white linen. Tang, wearing a sleeveless white garment, would perform amidst them as poacher, tiger, and man consuming the tiger's penis. 

A modified version of the work was further developed as an installation during the two-week A Sculpture Seminar organised by Tang in 1991 to discuss ideas about sculpture, with many artists from The Artists Village participating. Tang brought one of the tigers from his earlier performances of Tiger's Whip as a teaching tool, and participants contributed their thoughts on its form and structure. This process led to the creation of the final form of the installation, collaboratively developed and exhibited during A Sculpture Seminar, as a single tiger pouncing on a rocking chair, with a trail of red fabric akin to a stream of blood. In February 1995, the Museum chose Tiger's Whip to represent Singapore at the Africus International Biennale in Johannesburg, South Africa. Another of Tang's works in the Singapore Art Museum is an untitled sculpture often called Axe (1991), which is an axe with a plant growing out of its wooden handle. It is regarded as an early example of found object art in Singapore.

A focus of Tang's art is the theme of national and cultural identities, I Was Born Japanese (1995) being an example. Tang notes that he has had four nationalities. He was issued with a Japanese birth certificate as he was born during the Japanese Occupation of Singapore. He became a British national after World War II, a Malaysian citizen when Singapore joined the Federation of Malaysia in 1963, and a Singaporean citizen when Singapore gained full independence in 1965. While living in the UK he was conscious of his Chinese identity, but later on he took the view that he might not be fully Chinese since China had been occupied by the Mongols and Manchurians: "I'm not sure if I'm 100% Chinese blood. I'm sure my ancestor has got mixture of Mongolian and even Thai and Miao people . We are all mixed, and this is true. But I always like to think that there is only one race in the world. We are all one human race." Another of Tang's performances, Jantung Pisang – Heart of a Tree, Heart of a People, centres around the banana tree. He was inspired by the fact that the banana is used widely in Southeast Asia as an offering to bring blessings, but is also feared as it is associated with ghosts and spirits. He also sees banana trees as a reminder of the lack of democracy in certain parts of the world: "Democracy in many Asian countries and Third World countries is as shallow as the roots of a banana tree. We need to deepen [democracy]."

Tang has participated in numerous community and public art projects, workshops and performances, as he believes in the potential of the individual and collective to effect social changes. He has said: "An artist should introduce to others what he sees and learns of something. His works should provoke thoughts, not to please the eyes or to entertain, much less for decoration."

Awards
Tang received a Singapore International Foundation art grant to participate in the International Art Symposium in Meiho, Japan, in October 1994. In March the following year, he received a trophy and S$20,000 from the Japanese Chamber of Commerce and Industry Foundation. For his originality and influence in performance art in Southeast Asia, among other contributions, Tang won the Arts and Culture Prize in 1999 at the 10th Fukuoka Asian Culture Prizes which were established by Fukuoka and Yokatopia Foundation to honour outstanding work of individuals or organizations to preserve and create the unique and diverse culture of Asia.

Major exhibitions and performances

Notes

References
.
.
.
.
..

Further reading

Articles and websites
.
.

Books
.
.
.
.
.

News reports

.
.
.
.

External links
.
.
.

Singaporean artists
Singaporean installation artists
Singaporean painters
Singaporean sculptors
Alumni of Goldsmiths, University of London
Alumni of Birmingham City University
Singaporean people of Chinese descent
1946 births
Living people
Singaporean performance artists